Ebstorf is a municipality in the district of Uelzen, in Lower Saxony, Germany. It is situated approximately 12 km northwest of Uelzen, and 25 km south of Lüneburg.

Ebstorf was the seat of the former Samtgemeinde ("collective municipality") Altes Amt Ebstorf.

See also
 Ebstorf Map

References

Uelzen (district)